IGG, IgG or igg may refer to:

 IGG Inc., a Chinese video game company
 IGG Software, an American software company
 Igiugig Airport, code IGG
 Immunoglobulin G, a type of antibody
 Independent Investigations Group, the former name of the Center for Inquiry Investigations Group (CIIG)
 Inert gas generator, a kind of machinery aboard tankers
 investigative genetic genealogy, utilizing genetic information for identifying suspects or victims in criminal cases

See also 
 IG (disambiguation)